Newcastle Breakers Football Club was an Australian professional association football club based in Newcastle. The club was formed in 1991 and joined the National Soccer League in the 1991–92, season until they became defunct in 2000. The club's first team spent eight seasons in the National Soccer League. The table details the club's achievements in major competitions, and the top scorers for each season.

History
With no representing team from Newcastle in the National Soccer League since Newcastle Rosebud United (now Adamstown Rosebud) in 1986, the Newcastle Breakers joined the league in the 1991–92 season and finished 11th out of 14 while only being eliminated in the first round of the NSL Cup. The team would go closer to the Finals series spot the next season finishing 8th, but until then more failures started to qualify for the Finals series in the next few seasons. Although the team did not participate in the league in the 1994–95 season; the 1995–96 campaign saw new manager John Kosmina, the team finishing bottom of the league and having the most losses in an NSL season of 24, however reaching the NSL Cup Final defeated by South Melbourne in the same season. The next two seasons were also fails to qualify for the Finals series as the NSL Cup had been demised from 1997 onwards. From the 1998–99 season, it would be the last two seasons of the club's existence with better league finishes but still missing the Finals series meaning that the club had never qualified for the Finals series of every eight seasons played which caused the demise of the club leading to the formation of new club Newcastle United (now Newcastle Jets).

Key
Key to league competitions:

 National Soccer League (NSL) – Australia's former top football league, established in 1977 and dissolved in 2004.

Key to colours and symbols:

Key to league record:
 Season = The year and article of the season
 Pos = Final position
 Pld = Matches played
 W = Matches won
 D = Matches drawn
 L = Matches lost
 GF = Goals scored
 GA = Goals against
 Pts = Points

Seasons

References
Specific

Newcastle Breakers